The 2019 Edo State House of Assembly election was held on March 9, 2019, to elect members of the Edo State House of Assembly in Nigeria. All the 24 seats were up for election in the Edo State House of Assembly.

Results

Estako West II 
APC candidate Aliyu Oshiomhole won the election.

Estako West I 
APC candidate Ganiyu Audu won the election.

Igueben 
APC candidate Ephraim Aluebhosele won the election.

Esan West 
APC candidate Marcus Onobun won the election.

Esan South East 
APC candidate Sunday Ojiezele won the election.

Esan Central 
APC candidate Victor Edoror won the election.

Esan North East II 
APC candidate Emmanuel Okoduwa won the election.

Esan North East I 
APC candidate Francis Okiye won the election.

Ovia South West 
APC candidate Sunday Aghedo won the election.

Ovia North East II 
APC candidate Vincent Uwadiae won the election.

Ovia North East I 
APC candidate Ugiagbe Dumez won the election.

Uhunmwode 
APC candidate Washington Osifo won the election.

Oredo East 
APC candidate Osaro Obazee won the election.

Orhionmwon East 
APC candidate Nosayaba Okunbor won the election.

Orhionmwon West 
APC candidate Roland Asoro won the election.

Ikpoba-Okha 
APC candidate Henry Okhuarobo won the election.

Egor 
APC candidate Crosby Eribo won the election.

Oredo West 
APC candidate Chris Okaeben won the election.

Estako East 
APC candidate Kingsley Ugabi won the election.

Estako Central 
APC candidate Oshoma Ahmed won the election.

Owan West 
APC candidate Micheal Ohio-Ezo won the election.

Owan East 
APC candidate Eric Okaka won the election.

Akoko-Edo I 
APC candidate Yekini Idaiye won the election.

Akoko-Edo II 
APC candidate Emmanuel Agbaje won the election.

References 

Edo State House of Assembly elections
2019 Nigerian House of Assembly elections